The Andorra national rugby sevens team is the official Andorra representative in international competitions of Rugby sevens. The team has played in fourteen International Sevens Tournaments (WC Qualifier 1996 (1 round), WC Qualifier 2000 (1 round), FIRA-AER 2003 Qualifiers (1 round), FIRA-AER 2004 Qualifiers (2 rounds), FIRA-AER 2005 Qualifiers (2 rounds), FIRA-AER 2006 Qualifiers (2 rounds) and Finals, FIRA-AER 2007 Qualifiers (2 rounds) and Finals, FIRA-AER 2008 Qualifiers). In FIRA-AER, each year a number of tournaments take place across Europe and each nation takes part in two tournaments to decide on a final 12. In 2007, Andorra were joint 12th with Croatia but qualified on a points difference. The FIRA-AER qualifiers have seen placings of 5th (5 times), 4th (1 time) and 3rd (2 times). Both appearances in the finals have seen 12th (last) but notable teams have failed to qualify.

Tournament history

Rugby World Cup Sevens
Andorra did not qualify for the 1997 and 2001 Rugby World Cup Sevens.

Rugby Europe Sevens

See also
 Andorra national rugby union team

Sources
 IRB
 FIRA-AER
 Scrum.com
 Rugbyinternational.net

External links
 
 Andorran rugby fan site

National rugby sevens teams
Rugby union in Andorra
National sports teams of Andorra